The Station is a Grade II listed public house at Stoneleigh Broadway, Stoneleigh, Epsom, Surrey. It was originally opened in November 1935 as "The Stoneleigh Hotel" and was more recently known as "The Stoneleigh Inn" and then just "The Stoneleigh." It was built for Truman's Brewery and designed by their architect A. E. Sewell.

It was given Grade II listed status in 2015 by Historic England.

References

Epsom and Ewell
Grade II listed pubs in Surrey
A. E. Sewell buildings